John Rutherford (3 September 1935 – 25 December 2013) was an English cricketer. Rutherford was a blue for Queens' College, Cambridge, and played eleven first-class matches for Cambridge University Cricket Club between 1957 and 1958. He took ten wickets in his career, including that of the West Indies' vice-captain Clyde Walcott, during the West Indies tour of England in 1957.

See also
 List of Cambridge University Cricket Club players

References

External links
 

1935 births
2013 deaths
English cricketers
Cambridge University cricketers
People from Hawkhurst
Sportspeople from Kent